James Victor Purvis (born November 17, 1943) is a former American football defensive back. He played college football for Southern Miss.

College career
Purvis was a member of the Southern Miss Golden Eagles for five seasons, playing on the freshman team and then redshirting his sophomore year. He became the Golden Eagles starting quarterback as a redshirt sophomore. Over the course of his collegiate career Purvis compiled a record of 18-8-1 while passing for 1,727 yards and eight touchdowns with 21 interceptions and rushing for 1,495 yards and nine touchdowns. Purvis was inducted into the Southern Miss Athletic Hall of Fame in 1972.

Professional career
Purvis was signed by the Boston Patriots of the American Football League as an undrafted free agent in 1966 to play defensive back and to return kicks. Purvis was released by the Patriots on September 16, 1967 after he sustained a career-ending shoulder injury.

Post-football
After the end of his football career Purvis served as the color analyst for Southern Miss football for 41 years before retiring after the 2014 season. Purvis was inducted into the Mississippi Sports Hall of Fame in 2006.

References

External links
Mississippi Sports Hall of Fame bio

1943 births
Living people
American football defensive backs
American football quarterbacks
Southern Miss Golden Eagles football players
Boston Patriots players
Players of American football from Mississippi